This is a list of aviation-related events from 1905:

Events
 The engineer Maurice Stanislas Léger's helicopter lifts a person vertically into the air in Monaco.
 U.S. Army Signal Corps transferred all balloon school activities to Fort Omaha, Nebraska.

January–December
18 January – The Wright brothers begin discussions with the United States Government about selling it an airplane.
27 April – Sapper Moreton of the British Army's balloon section is lifted  by a kite at Aldershot under the supervision of the kite's designer, Samuel Cody.
29 April – Daniel Maloney is launched by balloon in a tandem-wing glider designed by John Montgomery to an altitude of  before release and gliding and then landing at a predetermined location as part of a large public demonstration of aerial flight at Santa Clara, California].
6 June – Gabriel Voisin lifts off of and flies along the River Seine in his float-glider towed by a motorboat.
23 June – The Wright brothers fly the Wright Flyer III for the first time. It is the first fully controllable and practical version of the original 1903 Wright Flyer.
14 July – Orville Wright has a serious crash with Wright Flyer III, upon which the Wright Brothers radically alter the aircraft. The front rudder is mainly the culprit for the Flyer's insistent pitching.
18 July – Daniel Maloney launches a tandem-wing glider designed by John Montgomery at Santa Clara, California. A balloon cable damages the glider and upon release Maloney and the aircraft fall uncontrolled to the ground, killing Maloney. This is the third death of a heavier-than-air aircraft pilot after Otto Lilienthal in 1896 and Percy Pilcher in 1899.
5 August – Nineteen-year-old Welshman Ernest Willows makes the first flight of Willows No. 1 a semi-rigid airship he had built.
31 August –Balloonist John Baldwin accidentally killed during a premature dynamite/balloon stunt at County Fair, Greenville Ohio
September – The Wright Brothers resume flight experiments with the re-designed Flyer III with performance of the airplane immediately in the positive. Smooth controlled flights lasting over 20 minutes now occur.
7 September – Flying circles over a cornfield near Dayton, Ohio, and chasing flocks of birds, Orville Wright records history's first bird strike. The dead bird lays on the airplane's wing before Wright makes a sharp turn and dumps it off.
4 October – Piloting the Flyer III over Huffman Prairie outside Dayton, Ohio, Orville Wright makes the first airplane flight in history of over 30 minutes in length.
The flight lasts for 39 minutes 23 seconds.
14 October – The Fédération Aéronautique Internationale (FAI) is founded in Paris.
16 October – The Wright brothers complete their 1905 test flight program, making their last flight until May 1908.
30 November – At Lake Constance, Count Ferdinand von Zeppelin's LZ2 airship is damaged significantly while attempting its first launch.
 December – Neil MacDermid is carried aloft in Canada by a large box kite named The Siamese Twins, designed by Alexander Graham Bell.

References

 
aviation
1905